Mugello Circuit is a motorsport race track in Scarperia e San Piero, Florence, Tuscany, Italy. The circuit stadium stands have a capacity of 50,000.

Grand Prix motorcycle racing host an annual event at the circuit (for MotoGP and smaller classes). In 2007 and 2008 the Deutsche Tourenwagen Masters held an annual event. The track is owned by Scuderia Ferrari since 1988, which uses it for Formula One testing. 

The first race of the A1GP 2008–09 season was originally planned to be held at the Mugello circuit on 21 September 2008. However, the race had to be cancelled due to the delay in building the new chassis for the new race cars.

The circuit hosted its first ever Formula One race on 13 September 2020, named the Tuscan Grand Prix, as part of the season being restructured due to the COVID-19 pandemic. This Grand Prix was the 1000th Grand Prix for Scuderia Ferrari.

History

Road race (1920–1970) 

Road races were held on public streets around Mugello from the 1920s. The start was in the village of Scarperia, less than half a kilometer from the current permanent circuit. The circuit went north up the SP503, twisting and turning through mountains through multiple villages, up to the town of Firenzuola. The circuit then went west from Firenzuola, continuing on the SP503 towards the village of Pagliana. The circuit then made a left on the SR65, heading south through the villages of Covigliaio, Selva and Traversa, where the circuit got a bit faster. The circuit then went past a German military cemetery (from 1946 onwards) and entered the famous Futa Pass, which was used for the prestigious Mille Miglia. After this twisty section, the course stayed on the SR65 and went down multiple short straights and fast curves before getting to the villages of Le Maschere and Colle Barucci. The circuit then crossed a bridge going over a narrow section of the Bilancino Lake, going through an ultra fast left hand curve and 2 long straights before turning left onto the SP129, heading towards the town of San Piero a Sieve. The circuit then went north back onto the SP503, heading back to Scarperia to end the lap.

Giuseppe Campari won at Mugello in 1920 and 1921, and Emilio Materassi took victories in 1925, 1926 and 1928. The Mugello GP was revived in 1955 and from the 1964 to 1969 as a Targa Florio-like road race consisting of eight laps of  each, including the Passo della Futa. The anticlockwise track passed the towns of San Piero a Sieve, Scarperia, Violla, Firenzuola, Selva, San Lucia. It counted towards the 1965, 1966 and 1967 World Sportscar Championship season. The last WC race was won by Udo Schütz and Gerhard Mitter in a Porsche 910. After two Porsche wins, 1968 saw the Alfa Romeo Tipo 33 of Luciano Bianchi, Nanni Galli and Nino Vaccarella prevail over the Porsche driven by Rico Steinemann and Jo Siffert. In 1969, Arturo Merzario won with an Abarth 2000, and he won again in 1970 with the same car, where Abarth finished 1–2–3 with Leo Kinnunen and Gijs van Lennep finishing second and third respectively.

The 1970 event brought about the end of the  Mugello public road circuit; a seven-month-old baby was killed when  crashed his Alfa Romeo GTA into a group of people in Firenzuola during a private test there, when the roads were open to the public (the roads were only closed on race day and for qualifying). Four other people, including two young children, were seriously injured. Although there had only been one previous fatality at the original Mugello circuit (that of Günther Klass in 1967), the incident badly damaged the event's reputation, and the 1970 race turned out to be the last one held on the public road circuit, which was won once again by Merzario. After the incident, Dini spent two months in prison, and after his time served he left Italy and did not return for many years.

Permanent circuit (1974–present) 

The circuit was used for the in-season test during the 2012 Formula One season, by all teams except HRT. An unofficial track record of 1:21.035 was set by Romain Grosjean during the test. The track was praised by Mark Webber, who stated that he "did 10 dry laps today around Mugello, which is the same as doing 1000 laps around Abu Dhabi track in terms of satisfaction". Four-time Formula One world champion Sebastian Vettel said “unfortunately we don’t have this track on the calendar. It’s an incredible circuit with a lot of high-speed corners”. Vitaly Petrov was however critical of the decision to test at Mugello, claiming the circuit was "unsafe".

On 10 July 2020, it was announced that the 2020 Tuscan Grand Prix on the circuit would be the ninth race in the 2020 Formula One calendar, marking the 1000th Grand Prix for Ferrari.

At the 2021 Italian motorcycle Grand Prix, Moto3 rider Jason Dupasquier was killed in an accident. The 19 year old Swiss rider fell at Arrabbiata 2 on his final qualifying lap and was struck by the bikes of Jeremy Alcoba and Ayumu Sasaki. The latter two riders escaped without injury, but Dupasquier was immediately airlifted to Careggi hospital in Florence, with his condition described as “very serious”. He would undergo emergency thoracic surgery that evening, but died of his injuries the following day.

Mugello has the 3-star FIA Environmental Accreditation, and the ISO 9001, ISO 14001, ISO 45001, ISO 20121 and Eco-Management and Audit Scheme certifications. It was ranked the most sustainable racetrack in the world in a 2021 report.

Winners of the Mugello Grand Prix 

The winners of the Mugello Grand Prix for cars (1919–1967: Circuito del Mugello, 1968–2000: Gran Premio del Mugello) are:

Winners on the closed circuit (5.245 km/3.259 mi)

Winners on the road circuit (66.2 km/41.3 mi) 
Note: The 1926 race was held on the Cascine circuit.

Multiple winners

MotoGP

Lap records 

The official lap record for the current circuit layout is 1:18.833, set by Lewis Hamilton in the 2020 Tuscan Grand Prix. The unofficial all-time track record is 1:15.144; also set by Lewis Hamilton during final qualifying for the aforementioned race. The fastest official race lap records at the Autodromo Internazionale del Mugello are listed as:

Events

 Current

 March: 24H Series Hankook 12H Mugello
 April: Mugello Classic
 May: CIV Superbike Championship
 June: Grand Prix motorcycle racing Italian motorcycle Grand Prix, MotoE World Championship Italian eRace
 July: Formula Regional European Championship, Italian GT Championship, TCR Italian Series, Porsche Carrera Cup Italy
 September: Porsche Sports Cup Suisse, CIV Superbike Championship
 October: Ferrari Challenge Finali Mondiali, Italian GT Championship, Italian F4 Championship, BOSS GP

 Former
 Auto GP (2000, 2005–2008, 2011, 2013)
 Deutsche Tourenwagen Masters (2007–2008)
 Deutsche Tourenwagen Meisterschaft (1994)
 Euroformula Open Championship (2020)
 European Formula 5000 Championship (1974)
 European Formula Two Championship Mugello Grand Prix (1974–1984)
 European Touring Car Championship (1976–1979, 1982–1984, 2000)
 FIA European Formula 3 Championship (1980–1982, 1984)
 FIA Formula 2 Championship (2020)
 FIA Formula 3 Championship (2020)
 FIA GT Championship (1997, 2006)
 FIM Endurance World Championship (1978, 1982, 1991, 1995–1996)
 Formula 3 Euro Series (2007–2008)
 Formula 750 (1979)
 Formula One Tuscan Grand Prix (2020)
 Grand Prix motorcycle racing San Marino motorcycle Grand Prix (1982, 1984, 1991, 1993)
 International Formula 3000 Mugello Grand Prix (1986, 1991, 1996–1997)
 International Touring Car Championship (1995–1996)
 Sidecar World Championship (1975–1976, 1981, 1983–1984)
 Superbike World Championship (1991–1992, 1994)
 World Sportscar Championship (1965–1967, 1975–1982, 1985)

See also 
 List of motor racing tracks

Notes

References

External links 

 
 RacingCircuits.info – History of Mugello Circuit
 Trackpedia's guide to Mugello
 https://web.archive.org/web/20160206232947/http://www.circuitostradaledelmugello.it/
 https://web.archive.org/web/20160307030039/http://theracingline.net/racingcircuits/racingcircuits/italy/mugelloold.html
 Free audio walkthrough of the track, for use with games
 Stadium Journey article

Superbike World Championship circuits
Grand Prix motorcycle circuits
Motorsport venues in Italy
Ferrari
Formula One circuits
Scarperia e San Piero